Five Little Indians is the debut novel by Cree Canadian writer Michelle Good, published in 2020 by Harper Perennial. The novel focuses on five survivors of the Canadian Indian residential school system, struggling with varying degrees of success to rebuild their lives in Vancouver, British Columbia after the end of their time in the residential schools. It also explores the love and strength that can emerge after trauma.

Five Little Indians was CBC's number one best selling book in 2021. It was selected for the 2022 edition of Canada Reads, nominated by Christian Allaire, Ojibway author and Vogue Fashion Editor.

Background 
Although the novel itself is fiction, some of the stories were based on real experiences of Good's mother and grandmother, who were survivors of the residential school system. Growing up, her mother talked about the traumatic histories and experiences of attending St. Barnabas Residential School in Onion Lake, Saskatchewan and these discussions influenced Good's life work. She worked on the novel for more than a decade, beginning the writing process in 2011 as a fine arts graduate student at the University of British Columbia. As part of the writing process, Good relied on psychological assessments of children who experienced physical and sexual abuse in order to accurately depict the long-term impacts on a person's life.

Reception 
Five Little Indians was CBC's number one best selling book in 2021.

The book received positive reviews from the Toronto Star, Vancouver Sun, and Apple Books.

National Bestseller; A Globe and Mail Top 100 Book of the Year; A CBC Best Book of the Year; An Apple Best Book of the Year; A Kobo Best Book of the Year; An Indigo Best Book of the Yea 

Amnesty International selected Five Little Indians for their 

Now named Five Little Indians one of the top ten novels of 2020. The Globe and Mail, CBC, Kobo, and Indigo also named the book in their lists of the best books of the year.

The novel was selected for the 2022 edition of Canada Reads, where it was defended by Christian Allaire. It won the competition on March 31.

Awards and honors

Television adaptation 
Five Little Indians has been optioned by Prospero Pictures for development as a limited television series. Shannon Masters, who is of Cree Métis and Ukrainian descent, will serve as writer and show runner alongside Martin Katz and Karen Wookey, who will serve as executive producers.

In an interview, "Good said she hopes the adaptation will make the story accessible to more people."

References

2020 Canadian novels
2020 debut novels
First Nations novels
Governor General's Award-winning fiction books
Novels set in Vancouver
Works about residential schools in Canada
Novels set in the 1960s
HarperCollins books